Tenhult is a locality situated in Jönköping Municipality, Jönköping County, Sweden with 2,977 inhabitants in 2010. Lake Tenhultasjön lies to the southeast of the town.

Sports
Tenhult has a soccer club, Tenhults IF who play in Division 2. Tenhults IF is managed by Mattias Fejes.

Buildings
Tenhult has two groceries, a library, three churches and an elementary school (Tenhultsskolan).

References 

Populated places in Jönköping Municipality